The following active airports serve the Parry Sound area of Ontario, Canada:

Canadian Coast Guard's Parry Sound Base has a helipad and not linked to nearby water aerodrome CPS1.

See also 

 List of airports in the Bala, Ontario area
 List of airports in the Bracebridge area
 List of airports in the Fergus area
 List of airports in the London, Ontario area
 List of airports in the Ottawa area
 List of airports in the Port Carling area
 List of airports in the Sault Ste. Marie, Ontario area
 List of airports in the Thunder Bay area
 List of airports in the Greater Toronto Area

References 

 
Parry Sound, Ontario
Airports
Parry Sound, Ontario
Airports